Gillian Cross (born 1945) is a British author of children's books. She won the 1990 Carnegie Medal for Wolf and the 1992 Whitbread Children's Book Award for The Great Elephant Chase. She also wrote The Demon Headmaster book series, which was later turned into a television series by the BBC in January 1996; a sequel series was produced in 2019.

Biography

Gillian Clare Arnold was born in London on 24 December 1945 to James Eric and Joan Emma Arnold. She was educated at North London Collegiate School, Somerville College, Oxford, and the University of Sussex. She married Martin Cross in 1967, and they had four children: Jonathan, Elizabeth, Anthony, and Katherine.  

Cross's first published book was The Runaway. Three years later she inaugurated The Demon Headmaster series of seven books (1982 to 2002). She also completed The Dark Behind the Curtain, a horror story illustrated by David Parkins and published by Oxford University Press. It was highly commended for the 1982 Carnegie Medal from the Library Association, recognising the year's best children's book by a British subject. A Map of Nowhere was highly commended for the 1988 Carnegie and she won the Medal two years later for Wolf (Oxford, 1990).

Before becoming a full-time writer, Cross held several different jobs, including acting as an assistant to a Member of Parliament. She is now a full-time writer who often travels and gives talks in connection with her work. In early 2014, Cross became a patron for the Leamington Spa-based charity Cord, after their work in Sudan inspired her latest novel, After Tomorrow.

Works

 The Runaway (1979)
 The Iron Way (1979)
 Revolt at Ratcliffe's Rags (1979)
 A Whisper of Lace (1981)
 The Dark Behind the Curtain (1982)
 The Demon Headmaster series:
 The Demon Headmaster (1982)
 The Prime Minister's Brain (1985)
 The Revenge of the Demon Headmaster (1994)
 The Demon Headmaster Strikes Again (1996)
 The Demon Headmaster Takes Over (1997)
 Facing the Demon Headmaster (2002)
 Total Control (2017)
 Mortal Danger (2019)
 Born of the Sun (1983)
 On the Edge (1984)
 Swimathon! (1986)
 Chartbreak (1986); US title, Chartbreaker
 Roscoe's Leap (1987)
 A Map of Nowhere (1988)
 Rescuing Gloria (1989)
 Wolf (1990)
 The Monster from Underground (2009)
 Twin and Super-Twin (1990)
 The Mintyglo Kid (1991)
 Gobbo the Great (1991)
 Rent-a-Genius (1991)
 Save Our School (1991)
 The Great Elephant Chase (1992); US title, The Great American Elephant Chase
 The Tree House (1993)
 The Furry Maccaloo (1993)
 Beware Olga! (1993)
 What Will Emily Do? (1994)
 New World (1994)
 The Crazy Shoe Shuffle (1995)
 Posh Watson (1995)
 Pictures in the Dark (1996)
 The Roman Beanfeast (1996)
 The Goose Girl (1998)
 Tightrope (1999)
 Down with the Dirty Danes! (2000)
 Calling a Dead Man (2001); US title, Phoning a Dead Man
 The Treasure in the Mud (2001)
 Dark Ground trilogy, or The Lost trilogy:
 The Dark Ground (2004)
 The Black Room (2005)
 The Nightmare Game (2006)
 Sam Sorts It Out (2005)
 Brother Aelred's Feet (2007)
 Where I Belong (2007)
 After Tomorrow (2013)
 Shadow Cat (2015)

Notes

References

External links

 
 
Gillian Cross at Fantastic Fiction
Author profile and interview
Gillian Cross answers questions about writing

English children's writers
Carnegie Medal in Literature winners
Costa Book Award winners
Alumni of Somerville College, Oxford
Alumni of the University of Sussex
People educated at North London Collegiate School
Writers from London
1945 births
Living people